Hamburg-Harburg Rathaus station is a station of the Hamburg S-Bahn on the Harburg S-Bahn in the suburb Harburg in the German city of Hamburg and is capable of serving as a bunker.

Function as an S-Bahn station

Opened on 23 September 1983, the underground station is located under the Harburger Ring and is about 200 m long. It has three platform tracks and a reversing track for turning trains. Also located within the underground station facilities is the Hrf (Harburg-Rathaus) interlocking. The station is used by S3 and S31 services. Line S31 ends there in and between the peaks; in the evenings it is served only by line S3.

During the construction period two structures were built that could be extended as connections to a future branch line towards the southwest. One of them is located east of the station in the tunnel, the other is at the tunnel mouth towards Heimfeld.

After the lifts were replaced in 2006, the station was restored again in 2008 to increase protection from fire. As in many other underground S-Bahn stations in Hamburg, ceiling panels were removed to give more space for smoke to rise into in case of fire. As at other stations, the passage height in stairways was reduced to two metres around the fire exits to keep out smoke and to prevent smoke reaching the stairs and other parts of the station.

Function as a civil defence structure
The platform area of the S-Bahn station is also the city's largest fallout shelter. In an emergency, 5,000 people can survive there for two weeks. In adjacent rooms located on several floors there are rooms for serving the shelter, including extensive sanitation facilities and a large kitchen. In addition to the three platforms there is also an area for parking three long trains, which can be used for accommodating the civilian population. In total, 2,300 m2 are available. Since the end of the Cold War the bunker can only be made operational with a lead time of six months.

S-Bahn services 

The following services operate through the station.

See also 

 List of Hamburg S-Bahn stations

References

Notes

Sources
 
  (Lizenzausgabe. Ullstein, Frankfurt am Main u. a. 1988,  (Ullstein Nr. 34443 Ullstein-Sachbuch); New edition, expanded and updated. Nachttischbuch-Verlag, Berlin 2010,  (Reihe: Reprints 2).

External links 

Hamburg S-Bahn stations in Hamburg
Buildings and structures in Harburg, Hamburg
Hamburg Harburg Rathaus
Hamburg Harburg Rathaus
Railway stations located underground in Hamburg